Esprit-Conrad Mouren (1731-1795) was a secretary of the Municipality of Tarascon who wrote nine manuscripts during the French Revolution.

Conrad Mouren is part of a family of notaries, originally from Marseille, which had settled in Tarascon during the second half of the 16th century. He was secretary of the Municipality of Tarascon from 1773 to 1786. He was briefly incarcerated in Marseille in 1794.

Works
Volumes 1-9:
 Volume 1 (197 pages): Notes mélangées sans ordre de dates, de divers événements généraux et minutieux, et de ce qui s'est passé dans les États-Généraux de 1789 ; pour me servir d'amusement dans mes crises d'ennuy : contenant encore les choses les plus curieuses que j'ay vues
 Volume 2 (200 pages): Notes mélangées sans ordre de dates, de divers événements généraux et minutieux ; et la continuation des États-Généraux
 Volume 3 (198 pages): Notes mélangées sans ordre de dates, de divers événements généraux et minutieux ; et la continuation des États-Généraux
 Volume 4 (274 pages): Notes mélangées sans ordre de dates, de divers événements généraux et minutieux ; et la continuation des États-Généraux
 Volume 5 (333 pages): Notes mélangées sans ordre de dates, de divers événements généraux et minutieux ; et de ce qui s'est fait dans la seconde session de l'assemblée Nationale
 Volume 6 (190 pages): Notes mélangées sans ordre de dates, de divers événements généraux et minutieux, et de ce qui s'est fait dans la seconde session de l'assemblée Nationale, contenant encore les choses les plus curieuses que j’ay vues
 Volume 7 (294 pages): Notes mélangées sans ordre de dates, de divers événements généraux et minutieux, et de ce qui s'est passé dans la Convention nationale, contenant encore les choses les plus curieuses que j'ay vues
 Volume 8 (286 pages): Notes mélangées sans ordre de dates, de divers événements généraux et minutieux, contenant le jugement et la mort de Louis XVI et de ce qui s'est passé dans la Convention nationale, contenant encore les choses les plus curieuses que j'ay vues
 Volume 9 (447 pages): Notes mélangées sans ordre de dates, de divers événements généraux et minutieux, et de ce qui s'est passé dans la Convention nationale, contenant encore les choses les plus curieuses que j'ay vues

References

People from Tarascon
1731 births
1795 deaths
French memoirists